Anatoli Yevstigneyevich Maslyonkin (June 29, 1930 – May 16, 1988) was a Soviet Russian footballer.

Honours
 Soviet Top League winner: 1956, 1958, 1962.
 Soviet Cup winner: 1958.

International career
He earned 33 caps for the USSR national football team, and participated in two World Cups, as well as the first ever European Nations' Cup in 1960, where the Soviets were champions. He also won a gold medal in Football at the 1956 Summer Olympics.

References

External links
Profile on RussiaTeam 
Maslenkin's History 

1930 births
1988 deaths
Russian footballers
Soviet footballers
Soviet Union international footballers
1958 FIFA World Cup players
1962 FIFA World Cup players
1960 European Nations' Cup players
UEFA European Championship-winning players
Soviet Top League players
FC Spartak Moscow players
FC Shinnik Yaroslavl players
Olympic footballers of the Soviet Union
Footballers at the 1956 Summer Olympics
Olympic gold medalists for the Soviet Union
Honoured Masters of Sport of the USSR
Olympic medalists in football
Medalists at the 1956 Summer Olympics
Association football midfielders
Association football defenders